Alfred Marie-Jeanne (born November 15, 1936 in Rivière-Pilote, Martinique) is a French politician, a leader in the Martinican Independence Movement (MIM) since 1978. He served as mayor of the commune of Rivière-Pilote from 1971 to 2000 and served as President of the Regional Council of Martinique from March 20, 1998 to March 22, 2010. Alfred Marie-Jeanne represented Martinique's 1st constituency in the French National Assembly from 2012 to 2017. He was succeeded in this constituency by Josette Manin.

Gran Sanblé pour ba peyi an chans, a coalition of the Martinican Independence Movement and right-wing parties, led by Alfred Marie-Jeanne defeated , a coalition of left-wing parties, led by Serge Letchimy winning 33 seats out of 51 seats of the Territorial Collectivity's new assembly during the election held on December 13, 2015 in Martinique. Alfred Marie-Jeanne served as the president of the executive council of the Territorial Collectivity of Martinique from 2015-2021.

References

1936 births
Living people
People from Rivière-Pilote
Martinican Independence Movement politicians
Presidents of the Regional Council of Martinique
Mayors of places in Martinique
Martiniquais people of French descent
Deputies of the 12th National Assembly of the French Fifth Republic
Deputies of the 13th National Assembly of the French Fifth Republic
Deputies of the 14th National Assembly of the French Fifth Republic